Julián Pastor (18 October 1943 - 24 August 2015) was a Mexican actor and film director. He appeared in more than sixty films from 1973 to 2008.

Filmography

References

External links 

1943 births
2015 deaths
Mexican male film actors
Mexican film directors
Male actors from Mexico City